The India men's national field hockey team represents India in international field hockey competitions, and is governed by Hockey India. The team was formerly under the control of Indian Hockey Federation. India was the first non-European team to be a part of the International Hockey Federation.
In 1928, the team won its first Olympic gold medal and until 1960, the Indian men's team remained unbeaten in the Olympics, winning six gold medals in a row. The team had a 30–0 winning streak during this time, from their first game in 1928 until the 1960 gold medal final which they lost. India also won the World Cup in 1975. India's hockey team is the most successful team ever in the Olympics, having won a total of eight gold medals – in 1928, 1932, 1936, 1948, 1952, 1956, 1964 and 1980. India also has the best overall performance in Olympic history with 83 victories out of the 134 matches played. They have also scored more goals in the Olympics than any other team. They are also the only team ever to win the Olympics without conceding a single goal, having done so in 1928 and 1956.

The men in blues are also one of the most successful teams in Asia. They have won the Asian Games three times – in 1966, 1998 and 2014. India came out on top in the Asia Cup in 2003, 2007 and in 2017. India has won 43 out of 56 matches in the Asia Cup and holds the records for most wins and best winning percentage in the competition. They are also the most successful team in the Asian Champions Trophy, winning the competition three times – in 2011, 2016 and in 2018. In total, India has won 27 official international titles.

India is known to have an intense rivalry with Pakistan, with whom they have played in the finals of major tournaments like Olympics, World Cup, Asian Games and Asia Cup. India also has a unique record of beating Pakistan in the finals of all these tournaments.

History

Golden years (1928–1959)
India participated at the Olympics for the first time in 1928. In the group stage, India beat Austria 6–0, Belgium 9–0 and Switzerland 5–0 without conceding a single goal. They defeated Netherlands 3–0 in the finals under the captaincy of Jaipal Singh Munda. India then went on to successfully defend their title at the  1932 Olympics with a 11–1 win over Japan and 24–1 win over USA, in the match against United States Dhyan Chand hit 8 goals and Roop Singh scored 10 goals, This is still the largest margin of victory ever in the Olympic games even after all these years. India went on to win their third straight title at the 1936 Olympics, this time captained by legendary player Dhyan Chand himself. India stormed through the group stage by winning against Japan 9–0, Hungary 4–0 and United States 7–0. In the semi-finals they defeated France 10–0. The team went on to face Germany in the final. The match was won by India 8–1 and it still remains the biggest winning margin in an Olympic final. The Indian hockey team that won three successive Olympic titles is often regarded as one of the greatest ever team to play the sport.

The World War II caused the cancellation of 1940 and 1944 Olympics, which ended the era of a team that dominated world hockey.
In the 1948 Olympics India was placed in group A and won all the three games, an 8–0 win over Austria, Argentina 9–1 and Spain 2–0. In the final India went on to face Great Britain, it was the first time India faced them. The skilled British team had already won the gold medal in 1908 and 1920, so this match was billed as a "Battle of Champions" and eventually India won the match 4–0. The result was a sweet one for India, which gained independence from Britain just a year before. This win is often regarded as the greatest ever moment of Indian field hockey and also all of Indian sports.

India went on to win 2 further gold medals in 1952 and 1956, preserving its record as the most successful and dominant team at that time in the Olympics. In 1952 Olympics quarter-finals India won against Austria 4–0, Great Britain 3–1 in semi-final and defeated Netherlands 6–1 in the final. The match is famous for the 5 goal magical performance of Balbir Singh Sr.,which is an Olympic record that still stands today. In the 1956 Olympics India defeated Afghanistan 14–0, United States 16–0 and Singapore 6–0 in group stage. India defeated Germany 1–0 in semi-final. In the final India faced Pakistan and won the match 1–0, which was the beginning of the biggest rivalry in field hockey. India and Pakistan again met each other in 1958 Asian Games and this time the match ended in a 0–0 draw. India also defeated Japan 8–0, South Korea 2–1 and Malaysia 6–0. But Pakistan claimed gold medal in the Asian Games by better average. It was the first time India finished runners-up in an international competition.

Last years of dominance (1960–1980)
At the 1960 Olympics India started its campaign by winning against Denmark 10–0, and Netherlands 4–1, New Zealand 3–0. India defeated Australia and Great Britain in quarter-finals and semi-finals respectively. In the final it was the beginning of a new era, for the first time India lost a match at the Olympics, a 0–1 loss to Pakistan in the final which ended India's streak of six successive gold medals and 30 matches unbeaten run. Two years later India went on to win another silver medal at the 1962 Asian Games. India returned strongly at the 1964 Tokyo Olympics by registering wins against Hong Kong, Belgium, Netherlands, Malaysia and Canada and drawing with Spain and Germany. In the Semi-finals India defeated Australia 3–1, and they won against Pakistan in the final to take their seventh gold medal at the games and also went on to capture their first gold medal in 1966 Asian Games by defeating Pakistan again in the final.

At the 1968 Mexico Olympics India started with a loss against New Zealand but won all of their remaining 6 matches against West Germany, Japan, Spain, Mexico, East Germany and Belgium but India went to a new low, for the first time as they were defeated in the semi-final by Australia, but they successfully claimed the bronze medal by beating West Germany. At the 1972 Olympics also the result was same India started brightly by defeating Great Britain, Australia, Kenya, New Zealand and Mexico but drew with Netherlands and Poland. They were defeated in the semi-finals by Pakistan. In the Third-place match India defeated the Netherlands to claim bronze medal.

India won the bronze medal at the 1971 World Cup by virtue of a win over Kenya. In the 1973 World Cup India defeated Pakistan in semi-finals, but lost to Netherlands in the final in penalty shoot-out after the match ended in a 2–2 draw. But in the 1975 World Cup India defeated Malaysia in the semi-final before beating arch-rivals Pakistan in the final to claim their first title.In the 1976 Olympics astro-turf hockey pitch was introduced, India struggled to maintain their dominance like they did on grass fields and for the first time ever returned home empty handed. The
1980 Olympics was held in Moscow, India started their campaign with an 18–0 win over Tanzania followed by a 2–2 draw with Poland and Spain which were followed by a  resounding win over Cuba with a margin of 13–0 and win over Soviet Union by a scoreline of 4–2. India later won the gold medal for a record eighth time by defeating Spain in the final by the score of 4–3.

Decline (1981–1997)
After the 1980 Olympics success India's performance declined and the following decades resulted in a lot of ups and downs for the national team. As the team failed to win any medal in the World cup or Olympics, but continued to be a top team in Asia and went on to win several medals in continental competitions. The 1982 World Cup was hosted by India and they finished at 5th position. The team lost to Pakistan in both 1982 Asian Games final and the inaugural Asia Cup final held in Karachi.India ended the 80s by winning bronze medal at the 1986 Asian Games and 1982 Champions Trophy and silver medals at the 1985 Asia Cup and 1989 Asia Cup. Their only gold medal success in a big tournament in the 80s came at the 1985 Sultan Azlan Shah Cup.
India also went on to win 1991 Sultan Azlan Shah Cup and reached finals of 1994 Asia Cup but lost to South Korea in the final. The team then went on to win the 1995 Sultan Azlan Shah Cup.

Resurgence (1998–2012)
India won their first continental title after 32 years at the 1998 Asian Games by defeating South Korea. The team finished fourth at the 1998 Commonwealth Games. They ended the decade by collecting bronze medal at the 1999 Asia Cup.

India started the new millennium by winning the inaugural hockey champions challenge defeating South Africa in the final. In 2003 India won their first ever Asia Cup title by defeating Pakistan in the final. The same year India also clinched the first and only Afro-Asian Games title by defeating Pakistan again in the final. For the First time in their history the team did not win a medal at the Asian Games as they finished fifth at the 2006 Asian Games, but India defended their title successfully in the Asia Cup by winning the 2007 Asia Cup. In the final the team conveniently beat South Korea 7–2. India failed to qualify for 2008 Beijing Games for the first time.
 
The next Asia Cup tournament in 2009 proved to be disastrous as the team finished fifth and failed to get any medal.  But the team regained momentum after winning the 2009 Sultan Azlan Shah Cup and also became the joint winners in the 2010 edition. In the 2010 World Cup, which was hosted in India, and the team finished on 8th position. In the 2010 Commonwealth Games which was again hosted by India, the national team reached the final where they were defeated 0–8 by Australia, the biggest defeat India ever suffered. India became the first ever champions of the Asian Champions Trophy after they beat Pakistan in the final of the 2011 edition. In 2012 the team finished last at the Olympics as they lost all their matches, it was disappointing given the fact that they are the most successful team ever at the Olympics. India also finished as runners-up at the 2012 Asian Champions Trophy.

2013–present (Olympic comeback) 
After the disappointment in Olympics India played at the 2013 Asian Champions Trophy but could only finish at 5th place. The 2014 Asian Games became the turning point as the team defeated Pakistan to win their 3rd gold medal.
In 2014–15 Hockey World League India won the bronze medal by beating Netherlands. The team reached the finals of 2016 Men's Hockey Champions Trophy but lost to Australia in penalty shootout. But bounced back by winning Asian Champions Trophy in 2016 Asian Champions Trophy by defeating Pakistan and 2017 Asia Cup by defeating Malaysia. The team also won bronze medal at the 2016–17 Hockey World League by defeating Germany 2–1.

The 2018 Asian Games proved little disappointing as India was the defending champions as well as the favorites to win but was surprised by Malaysia in semi-final. They later won bronze medal by defeating Pakistan 2–1. The team returned strongly by winning 2018 Asian Champions Trophy and collecting a gold medal at the 2018–19 Men's Hockey Series. India played as hosts in the 2018 Hockey World Cup and reached the quarter-finals but lost to Netherlands. 

Indian team won bronze in 2020 Tokyo Olympics after defeating Germany 5–4. This was a historic win as the Indian Hockey team won a medal in Olympics after a gap of 41 years.

Gallery

Competitive record

Summer Olympics

World Cup

Asian Games

Asia Cup

Asian Champions Trophy

Commonwealth Games

Pro League

Other tournaments

Sultan Azlan Shah Cup

South Asian Games

Defunct competitions

World League

Champions Trophy

Champions Challenge

Hockey Series

Afro-Asian Games

Western Asiatic Games

Honours

Olympic Games
 First place: 1928, 1932, 1936, 1948, 1952, 1956, 1964, 1980
 Second place: 1960
 Third place: 1968, 1972, 2020

World Cup
 First place: 1975
 Second place: 1973
 Third place: 1971

Champions Trophy
 Second place: 2016, 2018
 Third place: 1982

FIH Pro League
 Third place: 2021–22

Hockey World League
 Third place: 2014-15, 2016-17

Asian Games
 First place: 1966, 1998,  2014
 Second place: 1958, 1962, 1970, 1974, 1978, 1982, 1990, 1994, 2002
 Third place: 1986, 2010,  2018

Asia Cup
 First place: 2003, 2007, 2017
 Second place: 1982, 1985, 1989, 1994, 2013
 Third place: 1999, 2022

Asian Champions Trophy
 First place: 2011, 2016, 2018
 Second place: 2012
 Third place: 2021

Commonwealth Games
 Second place: 2010, 2014, 2022

Sultan Azlan Shah Cup
 First place: 1985, 1991, 1995, 2009, 2010
 Second place: 2008, 2016, 2019
 Third place: 1983, 2000, 2006, 2007, 2012, 2015, 2017

Champions Challenge
 First place: 2001
 First place: 2011
 Third place: 2007, 2009

Hockey Series
 First place: 2018-19

South Asian Games
 First place: 1995
 Second place: 2006, 2010, 2016

Afro-Asian Games
 First place: 2003

Western Asiatic Games
 First place: 1934

Results and fixtures

2022

2023

Players

Current squad
The following players were named for the 2022–23 Men's FIH Pro League.

Caps updated as of 15 March 2023, after the match against Australia.

Recent call-ups
The following players have also been called up for the national team in the last 12 months.

Support staff
Head coach: David John, BJ Kariappa (interim)
Assistant coach:
Team Manager: Shivendra Singh

Notable former players

 Dhyan Chand
 K. D. Singh
 Kishan Lal
 Jaipal Singh Munda
 Richard Allen
 Joseph Galibardy
 Earnest Goodsir-Cullen
 William Goodsir-Cullen
 Peter Fernandes
 Leslie Claudius
 Raghbir Singh Bhola
 Baboo Nimal
 Hiranna M. Nimal
 Prithipal Singh
 Balbir Singh, Sr.
 Udham Singh
 Charanjit Singh
 Shankar Lakshman
 Jaman Lal Sharma
 M. P. Ganesh
 Ashok Kumar
 Mohammed Shahid
 Mohammed Riaz
 Cyril Michie
 Ajit Pal Singh
 Balbir Singh Kullar
 Merwyn Fernandes
 Satbir Singh
 Surjit Singh
 B. P. Govinda
 Zafar Iqbal
 Marcellus Gomes
 Jagbir Singh
 Thoiba Singh
 M. M. Somaya
 Vasudevan Baskaran
 Jalaluddin Rizvi
 Pargat Singh
 Dhanraj Pillay
 Jude Menezes
 Jugraj Singh
 Viren Rasquinha
 Ignace Tirkey
 Adam Sinclair
 Mukesh Kumar
 Arjun Halappa
 Len Aiyappa
 Devesh Chauhan
 Adrian D'Souza
 Gagan Ajit Singh
 Deepak Thakur
 Prabhjot Singh
 Bimal Lakra
 Aslam Sher Khan
 Ghulam Moinuddin Khanji
 Baljit Singh Dhillon
 Bharat Chettri
 Harbinder Singh
 Sandeep Singh
 Sardara Singh
 Dilip Tirkey
 S. V. Sunil
 Danish Mujtaba
 Rupinder Pal Singh

See also
Field hockey in India
India men's national under-21 field hockey team
India women's national field hockey team
List of Indian field hockey captains in Olympics

References

External links

FIH profile

 
1
Asian men's national field hockey teams